Henry Weidell (May 20, 1889 – January 9, 1950), nicknamed "Bugs", was an American Negro league pitcher in the 1910s.

A native of St. Paul, Minnesota, Weidell played for the All Nations club in 1916. He died in Minneapolis, Minnesota in 1950 at age 60.

References

External links
Baseball statistics and player information from Baseball-Reference Black Baseball Stats and Seamheads

1889 births
1950 deaths
All Nations players
Baseball pitchers
Baseball players from Saint Paul, Minnesota
20th-century African-American people